Krasny Bogdan is a rural locality (a khutor) in Yulkinskoye Rural Settlement, Chernyshkovsky District, Volgograd Oblast, Russia. The population was 82 as of 2010.

Geography 
Krasny Bogdan is located 29 km southeast of Chernyshkovsky (the district's administrative centre) by road. Yolkino is the nearest rural locality.

References 

Rural localities in Chernyshkovsky District